The Massachusetts Bay Transportation Authority (MBTA) system is mostly but not fully accessible. Like most American mass transit systems, much of the MBTA subway and commuter rail were built before wheelchair access became a requirement under the Americans with Disabilities Act of 1990. The MBTA has renovated most stations to be compliant with the ADA, and all stations built since 1990 are accessible. The MBTA also has a paratransit program, The Ride, which provides accessible vehicles to transport passengers who cannot use the fixed-route system.

Much of the MBTA subway system is accessible: all Orange and Red Line stations, and all but one Blue Line station, are accessible. Most of the underground portion of the Green Line is accessible, though only some surface stops are; all but one stop on the Ashmont–Mattapan High-Speed Line are accessible. About three-quarters of the MBTA Commuter Rail system is accessible, including the North Station and South Station terminals. All buses (including the Silver Line) and all MBTA boat services are accessible.

Subway

All stations on the Orange Line, Blue Line, and Red Line rapid transit lines of the MBTA subway system have high level platforms level with train floors, and all are accessible except for Bowdoin station on the Blue Line.

Most subway stations (except Boylston, Symphony, and Hynes Convention Center) and major surface stops on the light rail Green Line have -high platforms. These allow accessible boarding from the newer low-floor Type 8 and Type 9 vehicles, which have a built-in retractable bridge plate. Some stations have portable lifts or wooden wayside ramps for use with high-floor Type 7 vehicles; however, this boarding method is largely disused. The Ashmont–Mattapan High-Speed Line runs older, high floor PCC streetcars. Wooden ramps with bridge plates are at all stations except for Valley Road, which is inaccessible because of a steep incline from street level.

All subway transfer stations, and all stations that serve as major bus terminals, are accessible. Most have direct accessible transfers using elevators and short ramps, with some exceptions:
Transfers between the Red Line and the southbound Orange Line at Downtown Crossing station require use of the Winter Street Concourse and the Park Street elevator, while transfers between the southbound Red Line and northbound Orange Line require leaving fare control. A three-phase project to add additional elevators will allow direct transfers.
Harvard station has longer ramps connecting the Red Line platforms and busways to the lobby, allowing transfers without elevators. (Surface elevators connect to the lobby and the upper busway.)
A long ramp connects the lower busway at Sullivan Square station with the upper busway and the Orange Line lobby.

Commuter rail

, 108 out of 141 MBTA Commuter Rail stations (77%) are accessible. Six lines are entirely accessible: the Greenbush Line, Plymouth/Kingston Line, Middleborough/Lakeville Line, Fairmount Line, Providence/Stoughton Line, and Needham Line, while the other lines have a mix of accessible and non-accessible stations. All stations built or rebuilt since about 1987 are accessible; many older stations have been retrofitted and several other stations are currently being rebuilt for accessibility. Most of the non-accessible stations are located on the Fitchburg Line, Framingham/Worcester Line, and Franklin Line.

Of those stations that are accessible, some only have a short elevated platform that serves one or two cars. These "mini-high platforms" are usually located at the end of the station away from Boston, allowing them to be served by the car nearest the locomotive. They represent most accessible stations on the Franklin Line, Needham Line, Framingham/Worcester Line, Fitchburg Line, Lowell Line, Haverhill Line, and Newburyport/Rockport Line, as well as several stations on the Providence/Stoughton Line and Fairmount Line. Buzzards Bay station, used for the CapeFLYER service run with MBTA trains, also has mini-high platforms.

Some commuter rail stations, mostly newer stations and those in larger cities, have full-length high-level platforms that allow for accessible boarding on all cars. (The standard MBTA high-level side platform is 12 feet wide and 800 feet long, capable of fully handling a 9-car train. Some stations, including Forest Hills and Route 128, have Amtrak-style 1050-foot 12-car platforms.) The MBTA builds full-length high-level platforms at most new stations, and ultimately plans to build full-length high-level platforms at most stations except those requiring clearance for freight trains. Full-length platforms allow automatic power doors to be used, which allows passengers to board at all doors and thus speeding boarding times. High-level platforms are in place at all stations on the Greenbush Line, Kingston/Plymouth Line, and the Middleborough/Lakeville Line, as well as at stations on the Fairmount Line.

Non-accessible stations at Winchester Center and Natick Center are being renovated with high-level platforms. A new accessible station at Chelsea is under construction to replace the existing non-accessible station.

Blind and visually impaired

According to MBTA policies, "Customers who use service animals are welcome in all MBTA vehicles, stations, and facilities during all hours of operation. Customers must be in control of their service animal at all times. Animals are not permitted in seats."

Some train stations have yellow detectable warning strips with truncated domes running in a two-foot (60 cm) band along the edge of the platforms. Most Red, Orange, and Blue Line stations have these tactile strips; however, many less-used Green Line surface stops and commuter rail stations lack them.

Buses and trains are supposed to have either recorded announcements or driver announcements of station stops, but these announcements are sometimes muffled, inaudible, or omitted by automated systems. In the event that automated systems are not functioning properly, the vehicle driver or conductor is to announce stops over the public address system.

Hearing impaired
The MBTA has a TTY number for "T" information: (617) 222–5146. Many stations have TTY pay phones; the MBTA web site has a list.

The MBTA says it has reviewed its web site, http://www.mbta.com, using "the United States Section 508 guidelines and WCAG double AA guidelines, ... and made all required accommodations to help ensure that the site is accessible by users who rely on assistive technologies such as screen readers or other input mechanisms."

History

In 1975, the Massachusetts Architectural Access Board enacted its first regulations requiring accessibility of public facilities. All subsequent new rapid transit stations have been accessible. In the mid-1980s, the MBTA spent $80 million to extend the platforms of seven Red Line and three Orange Line stations to allow the use of six-car trains and add elevators. All new commuter rail stations have been accessible since the mid-1980s, with many existing stations renovated as well.

The pace of renovations increased after the 1990 Americans with Disabilities Act. Only 26 of the 80 key stations were accessible by 1990; $1.6 billion in renovations raised this to 69 in 2004. Green Line service was not accessible until around 2001, when key surface stops were retrofitted with raised platforms for use with new Type 8 LRVs. In 2006, the MBTA settled a class-action lawsuit, Joanne Daniels-Finegold, et al. v. MBTA, under which the agency agreed to add redundant elevators to a number of rapid transit stations and make other accessibility improvements.

See also 
 Accessibility of the Metropolitan Transportation Authority

References

External links
Accessibility on the MBTA

Accessible transportation
Accessibility